Smith Valley is an unincorporated community in White River Township, Johnson County, Indiana.

History
Smith Valley was named for William K. Smith, a pioneer settler. A post office was established at Smith Valley in 1870, and remained in operation until it was discontinued in 1902.

Geography

Notable people 
John J. Carson, member of the Federal Trade Commission (FTC) from 1948 to 1953; born in Smith Valley

References

Unincorporated communities in Johnson County, Indiana
Unincorporated communities in Indiana
Indianapolis metropolitan area